Bulazh (Bulaş) is a rural locality (a village) in Sterlibashevsky Selsoviet, Sterlibashevsky District, Bashkortostan, Russia. The population was 62 as of 2010. There are 2 streets.

Geography 
Bulazh is located 10 km southwest of Sterlibashevo (the district's administrative centre) by road. Mukhametdaminovo is the nearest rural locality.

References 

Rural localities in Sterlibashevsky District